The NWA Georgia Junior Heavyweight Championship was a championship in the NWA's Georgia Championship Wrestling promotion. It was strictly for the junior heavyweight wrestlers.

Title history

References

External links
 NWA Georgia Jr. Heavyweight Title History

National Wrestling Alliance championships
Georgia Championship Wrestling championships
NWA Wildside championships
Professional wrestling in Georgia (U.S. state)
Junior heavyweight wrestling championships
State professional wrestling championships
National Wrestling Alliance state wrestling championships